Yisel Rodríguez Llanes (born 30 January 1989) is a Cuban retired footballer who played as a midfielder. She has been a member of the Cuba women's national team until January 2012, when she defected while being in Vancouver, Canada during an international competitive tournament.

International career
Rodríguez capped for Cuba at senior level during the 2010 CONCACAF Women's World Cup Qualifying qualification and the 2012 CONCACAF Women's Olympic Qualifying Tournament (and its qualification).

References

1989 births
Living people
Defecting Cuban footballers
Cuban women's footballers
Cuba women's international footballers
Women's association football midfielders
21st-century Cuban women